David M. Solinger (1906 – October 29, 1996) was  a lawyer, art collector, and president of the Whitney Museum of American Art.

Biography
Solinger was born in New York City in 1906, the son of Maurice Solinger, a meatpacking business executive. After graduating from Cornell University and Columbia Law School, he worked as a senior partner at the Manhattan law firm Solinger and Gordon. He was one of the first lawyers to develop a specialty  in advertising, radio and television law and his clients included Louise Nevelson, Hans Hoffman, and Franz Kline.

In 1961, he was elected a trustee of the Whitney Museum of American Art and in 1966 he succeeded Flora Whitney Miller as its president, the first that was not a member of the Whitney family.  While trustee he was instrumental in moving the museum to a new facility designed by Marcel Breuer; and in 1973, as president, in the opening of its first branch location in lower Manhattan.

Art collection
Solinger collected 20th century art and owned works by Klee, Dubuffet, Giacometti, Leger, Miro, Kline, de Kooning, and Kandinsky as well as a 1927 Picasso, donating many to local museums.

Personal life
Solinger was married twice. In 1937, he married Hope Alva Gimbel, the daughter of Bernard Gimbel; the couple had two daughters before divorcing in 1978: Faith Solinger Sommerfield and Lynn Solinger Stern Lang. He remarried to Betty Ann Besch. Solinger died at his home in Manhattan on October 29, 1996.

References

External links
Oral history interview with David M. Solinger 1977 May 6

1906 births
1996 deaths
20th-century American Jews
American art collectors
20th-century American lawyers
Gimbel family
Cornell University alumni